A mail satchel is a type of mail bag that a letter carrier uses over-the-shoulder for assisting the delivery of personal mail on a designated route.

Etymology and word origins 
According to the Online Etymology Dictionary, the word mail in the modern sense, referring to the postal distribution of letters, dates back to the 12th century. The meaning was further extended to "letters and parcels" in the 18th century by way of "bag full of letters" (1650s) or "person or vehicle who carries postal matter" (1650s). The Online Etymology Dictionary says that in 19th century England, "mail" was interpreted as letters going abroad and local communications was defined as "post".
According to Online Etymology Dictionary the etymology of "satchel" is mid 14th century from Old French sachel from Latin of saccellum (money bag, purse) and sacculus or saccus (bag or sack).
 French: avec poignées means carrier bag with handles and sometimes refers to a postal mail sack.
According to an online dictionary "mail bag" originated 1805–1815.

History 
Commonly referred to as "satchels", letter carriers used leather-over-the shoulder type mail bags on their delivery and collection rounds. This form of satchel was most popular in city delivery service and city collection service. It has been used from about the 1860s in the United States and from the late 19th century in other countries worldwide. The city collector's satchels have two handles off the top of the leather bag itself. Formerly made of leather, such satchels were later made in lighter, but less durable, canvas, today a variety of materials may be encountered including hard wearing synthetics.

Postal service by letter carriers 
In August 1971, the United States Postal Service declared that when the existing stock of leather satchels was depleted, they would be replaced with canvas. The cited reason was the high price of "scarce" leather. The new canvas satchels also had a weight advantage, about 2 pounds, compared to the old leather mail bag's 4 pounds. The disadvantage of the new canvas satchels was durability, lasting about eighteen months before they had to be replaced, compared to a six-year lifespan for the old leather satchel.

Beginning in 1978, the new U.S. canvas style satchel mailbag bore an escutcheon on the middle outward facing panel: the U.S. Postal service's left-facing eagle logo starting in 1978. In 1986, the left-facing eagle logo was changed to a right-facing eagle logo. The old style of a left-facing eagle logo was still in use through 1989. In August, 1996, the satchel was again modified: the old style logo of a normal winged eagle was replaced with a futuristic "sonic eagle" logo. Reflective glow in the dark stripes added in December 1996.

In October 1997, a new double satchel was added to the tools used by U.S. letter carriers. Its advantage was that it would more equal weight distribution to prevent shoulder, back and neck strain. Its disadvantage was that it was a hindrance to defense from charging dogs. The preference to many letter carriers is the traditional single satchel where they are free to fend off dogs (e.g. pepper spray usage).

As one might expect, the form and structure of mail satchels has implications for fatigue and industrial injuries to mail carriers.

Satchel hand carts, mail trolleys, mail bikes, and Segways 
A U.S. "satchel cart" (caddy cart, container cart), United Kingdom "mail trolley" (postman's cart) or the European / Asian "mail bike" is an accessory tool for letter carriers of cities to assist their normal everyday over-the-shoulder heavy mail satchel. This type of accessory is used to cut down on return trips to the postal vehicle to collect or drop off mail. In Britain, mail trolleys are controversial, and viewed as a threat by some to the viability of bicycles, which use a form of satchel bag.  A "mail trolley" is used in the United Kingdom in addition to bikes for the "postmen".  It is also an employee safety feature because the cart is carrying the load, which could be up to 70 pounds, where a hand over-the-shoulder mail satchel for letter carriers carries up to 35 pounds of mail.

Postmasters authorize the use of satchel carts on certain the routes that would justify its use. Satchel carts carry two "mail satchels" that each would carry 35 pounds. Postmasters consider the following factors in assigning satchel carts:

 Relieves the letter carriers from carrying heavy loads of mail all the time (safety feature).

 Letter carriers with physical impairments get first priority.

 If the satchel cart is a detriment and slows down the letter carrier on his route, then the push cart is taken away from that letter carrier and given to another or put in storage.

  When a letter carrier uses a push cart, the normal 35-pound mail load limit does not apply. The two satchels on the cart are filled to capacity on each use, which could be as much as twice the normal 35-pound over-the-shoulder satchel mail load limit.

 Due to the greater carrying capacity of the 4 wheeled push cart the relay mail pick-up points are adjusted to be less often.

The typical "satchel cart" used by United States Postal Service is a four-wheeled cart with its mailbags that has a collapsible handle and front wheel brakes. It was used by the letter carriers in the late twentieth century and into the twenty-first century.

The future for mail carrying in some parts of the world may be represented by the Indian Postal Service's attempt to develop and deploy electric cargo tricycles. It has been suggested as a way to replace bicycles in India with vehicles that will enable carriers to travel farther and carry more at a lower cost. The "Soleckshaw" is "specifically suitable as a light delivery vehicle, for delivery of post, parcels and other postal services both in urban and rural areas".

It has been observed that the general trend in mail deliveries is a decrease in letter volume and an increase in the number and size of packages; bulk and weight increased so mail delivery methods had to be changed as a result. In one intracampus mail system, it was found that the use of Segways decreased emissions. "Increasingly heavier trays were leading to workplace accidents, exhaustion and dissatisfaction." Segway PTs fitted with custom mail bags, a derivative of the over-the-shoulder personal mail satchels, were seen as a cure for the postmen for many of these problems.

Letter carriers in the United Kingdom are instructed to use mail "trolleys" to prevent injuries from heavy shoulder satchels, and to not use bicycles.

See also 

 catcher pouch
 mail bag
 mail pouch
 mail sack
 mochila
 portmanteau
 Private Mail Bag.

Bibliography

Footnotes

References

Further reading

External links 

 

Bags
Philatelic terminology
Postal history
Postal services
Postal systems
United States Postal Service